The 2016 Richmond City Council elections took place in Richmond, Virginia on November 8, 2016. The election determined the Richmond City Council members from January 1, 2017 to December 31, 2020.

Election Results

The official election results are linked here:http://www.richmondgov.com/registrar/documents/OfficialElectionResults11-08-14.pdf

See also

2016 Virginia elections

References 

2016 Virginia elections
November 2016 events in the United States
Government of Richmond, Virginia
City Council election
Local elections in Virginia